Disheveled-associated activator of morphogenesis 1 is a protein that in humans is encoded by the DAAM1 gene. Evidence of alternative splicing has been observed for this gene but the full-length nature of these variants has not been determined.

Function 

Cell motility, adhesion, and cytokinesis, and other functions of the cell cortex are mediated by the reorganization of the actin cytoskeleton and recent evidence suggests a role for formin homology (FH) proteins in these processes.  The protein encoded by this gene contains FH domains and belongs to a novel FH protein subfamily implicated in cell polarity. Wnt/Fz signaling activates the small GTPase Rho, a key regulator of cytoskeleton architecture, to control cell polarity and movement during development. Activation requires Dvl-Rho complex formation, an assembly mediated by this gene product, which is thought to function as a scaffolding protein.

Clinical significance 

The deletion of a single copy of this gene has been associated with congenital heart defects.

References

Further reading